Arizona is a genus of snakes in the family Colubridae. They are endemic to the United States and Mexico.

Species

References

Colubrids
Snake genera
Taxa named by Robert Kennicott